Salem Fathi Elmslaty (born 31 October 1992), also spelled as Salem Al-Musallati and known widely as Salem Roma, is a Libyan footballer who plays for Al-Nasr as a striker.

International career

International goals
Scores and results list Libya's goal tally first.

Personal awards
Al-Nasr
 2016 Libyan Premier League top goalscorer with 8 goals.

References

1992 births
Living people
Libyan footballers
Libya international footballers
Association football forwards
Al-Nasr SC (Benghazi) players
Al-Ramtha SC players
Al-Baqa'a Club players
Mansheyat Bani Hasan players
Zakho FC players
Libyan Premier League players